Steven John Phillips (born 6 May 1978 in Bath, Somerset) is an English football goalkeeper, who was most recently goalkeeping coach at Yeovil Town.

Career
The West Country goalkeeper began his career playing for Coleford Athletic under 13s, he then moved into Non-League football with Paulton Rovers and then earned a big move to Bristol City where he went on to play 250 league appearances for the Ashton Gate outfit.

However, after an alleged falling out with City boss Gary Johnson he was replaced from the first team by Adriano Basso early into the 2005–06 season. Despite being in his testimonial season Phillips never figured regularly again for City.

In the summer of 2006, Phillips moved across the city to bitter rivals Bristol Rovers F.C. This was after Phillips made a "come and get me" plea to Swindon Town manager Dennis Wise through ex-City teammate Lee Peacock. Wise chose to pursue Petr Brezovan instead.

Phillips took over the number one jersey at Bristol Rovers, taking over from Scott Shearer and helped Rovers secure a play-off spot in the 2006/07 season with Phillips earning praise, and winning Player of the Year. Phillips won League Two's player of the month for November after not conceding any league goals during that month. He also won the Football League's Golden Glove competition after keeping the most clean sheets for the 2006–07 season.

Steve was in Turkey hoping to sign a contract with Turkish Super League Division Three team Ankara Demirspor. There was also interest from Turkish side Ankaragücü who already have English influences with former Manchester City striker Darius Vassell and former Luton Town winger Ian Henderson on their books. However, a contract was rejected from both teams, and he has returned to Rovers.

On 26 August 2009, Phillips signed for Shrewsbury Town on a one-month loan deal, which was soon extended. In November 2009, he joined League 2 side Crewe on a two-month loan with a view to make the move permanent. Phillips made his Crewe Alexandra debut against Morecambe in a 2–1 home loss. On 6 January 2010, Phillips extended his loan with Crewe until the end of the season. He established himself as number one, but missed the last three games of the season through a shoulder injury.

Along with 14 other players, he was released by Rovers at the end of the 2009–10 season, and, after his successful loan period, he was signed by Crewe. He quickly established himself in the Alex team and was part of the 2011–12 side promoted to League One. In an effort to keep hold of his first choice goalkeeper, Crewe manager Steve Davis offered Phillips a player/coach role in 2012.

After losing his first team place to youngster Ben Garratt, Phillips left the club at the end of the 2013–14 season to take up a coaching role with Shepton Mallet. He will also play non-league football with local club Nantwich Town.

In June 2015, he joined Bath City.
In 2016, he joined Mangotsfield United

In September 2017, Phillips joined League Two side Yeovil Town as interim goalkeeping coach following the departure of Sam Shulberg.

Honours
Bristol City
Football League Trophy: 2002–03 

Bristol Rovers
Football League Two play-offs: 2007
Football League Trophy runner-up: 2006–07

Crewe Alexandra
Football League Two play-offs: 2012
Football League Trophy: 2012–13

Individual
PFA Team of the Year: 2003–04 Second Division

References

External links
Steve Phillips at aylesburyunitedfc.co.uk

Bristol Rovers Supporters Club Player of the Year

1978 births
Sportspeople from Bath, Somerset
Living people
Association football goalkeepers
English footballers
Bristol City F.C. players
Gloucester City A.F.C. players
Evesham United F.C. players
Worcester City F.C. players
Bristol Rovers F.C. players
Shrewsbury Town F.C. players
Crewe Alexandra F.C. players
Nantwich Town F.C. players
Shepton Mallet F.C. players
Bath City F.C. players
Mangotsfield United F.C. players
Yeovil Town F.C. players
English Football League players
National League (English football) players
Yeovil Town F.C. non-playing staff
Association football goalkeeping coaches